Nilavagilu is a small village in Hunsur, Karnataka, India.

Villages in Mysore district